= Archives of Cardiovascular Diseases =

- Discipline: Cardiology
- Language: English
- Edited by: Ariel A. Cohen

Publication details
- Former name(s): Archives des Maladies du Coeur, des Vaisseaux, et du Sang; Archives des Maladies du Coeur et des Vaisseaux
- History: 1908-present
- Publisher: Elsevier
- Frequency: Monthly
- Impact factor: 2.271 (2015)

Standard abbreviations
- ISO 4: Arch. Cardiovasc. Dis.

Indexing
- ISSN: 1875-2136 (print); 1875-2128 (web)
- LCCN: 2008245201
- OCLC no.: 756998850

Links
- Journal homepage; Online archive

Archives of Cardiovascular Diseases is a monthly peer-reviewed medical journal covering the study of cardiovascular diseases. It was established in 1908 as Archives des Maladies du Coeur, des Vaisseaux, et du Sang, and changed its name to Archives des Maladies du Coeur et des Vaisseaux in 1937. It obtained its current name in 2008. It is published by Elsevier on behalf of the French Society of Cardiology, of which it is the official journal. The editor-in-chief is Ariel A. Cohen. According to the Journal Citation Reports, the journal has a 2019 impact factor of 2.434.
